Bishop Shanahan High School is located in Downingtown, Pennsylvania. It's part of the Archdiocese of Philadelphia's Catholic school system. Named after Right Rev. John W. Shanahan, the third bishop of Harrisburg, the school is the only archdiocesan high school in Chester County. Construction of the current building began in 1996. It opened in 1998, and the first class graduated from it in 1999.  The school had previously been located in West Chester, Pennsylvania. In June 2008, Bishop Shanahan celebrated its 50th anniversary with the graduation of its 50th senior class.

John W. Shanahan
Shanahan was born in 1846 in Susquehanna County, Pennsylvania. Shanahan's older brother, Jeremiah was also a bishop. At the age of 23, John Shanahan was ordained to the priesthood by his brother. Shanahan was educated at St. Joseph's College and St. Charles Borromeo Seminary. Immediately after being ordained, Shanahan received the position titled Superintendent of Catholic Schools in the Archdiocese of Philadelphia. He was also the pastor of Our Lady of Sorrows parish in Philadelphia. Shanahan held and maintained these positions until he became the bishop of Harrisburg in 1899. Shanahan died in February 1916 and currently rests in Mount Calvary Cemetery.

Seal and motto
The school seal is a shield separated into thirds, emblazoned with a cross (Faith), an anchor (Hope), and a heart (Love): the three Theological Virtues. Beneath the school shield is the motto "Quae sursum sunt Quaerite," which means "Seek the things that are found above".

Academics
Bishop Shanahan High School motivates lifelong learners through student-centered learning and a commitment to academic rigor. Bishop Shanahan's President is Fr. John Donia. The Principal is Dr. Robert Moran. 100% of Bishop Shanahan's graduates attend post-secondary institutions. In 2014, compared to the national SAT average, Bishop Shanahan students scored 55 points higher on reading, 37 on mathematics, and 68 on writing. The school operates under the Archdiocesan curriculum, which is very broad. Bishop Shanahan offers a wide variety of electives for students to take as well as required courses. Bishop Shanahan offers many different level courses based on students' learning capabilities and interests. Bishop Shanahan offers College Prep, Honors, Dual Enrollment, and AP level courses. English and Religion are the only two required subjects for all four years. Many different types of religion classes are offered, including; Morality, Church History, Life in Jesus, and Vocational Classes. Some English classes offered include; Genre Studies, British Studies, American Studies, and Contemporary Studies. In 2018, Bishop Shanahan introduced two new academic initiatives: the STEM Pathways Program and the Eagle Business Academy. STEM Pathways inspires the next generation of innovators by empowering students to be creative, collaborative, and critical-thinking problem solvers. This program takes an interdisciplinary approach to learning, where rigorous academic concepts are coupled with real-world applications. Shanahan students use STEM in contexts that make connections between school, community, work, and the wider world. The program ensures all BSHS students graduate with fluency in basic STEM literacy and provides a pathway to success in college, career, and beyond. At the conclusion of sophomore year, students who express a particular interest and aptitude in STEM will be invited to apply for the STEM Certificate Program. Students who successfully complete the STEM Certificate Program will graduate from Bishop Shanahan with an official certificate denoting their participation in the program, and that they have displayed advanced proficiency in STEM. The Eagle Business Academy is a four-year academic pathway that addresses college and career readiness skills. This program empowers students in the development of key skills including critical thinking, problem-solving, research, reading, writing, speaking, presenting,  teamwork,  analyzing, reasoning, negotiating, and questioning. The rigorous courses will enable students to apply these skills while identifying how the material connects to other academic disciplines. ​Students will learn about roles, responsibilities, and career paths of specific professions. This includes exposure to careers both in the classroom and through workplace visits.

Extracurricular activities 
Bishop Shanahan offers many different clubs and recreational activities for its students. Some of these include: DECA Business club, chorus, computer programming, academic bowl, community service corps, yearbook club, specific language clubs, mock trial, mathletes, National Honor Society, and world affairs club.

Athletics 
Bishop Shanahan High School Athletics compete in the Pennsylvania Interscholastic Athletic Association (PIAA). The PIAA was formed in 1913 with the goal to organize and promote athletics and good sportsmanship. Within the PIAA Bishop Shanahan competes in the Chesmont-National Division. The Chesmont League was founded in 1950 as a division for football, men's basketball, and track and field to compete. Since then it has greatly expanded. The Chesmont-National division includes, Avon Grove, Coatesville, Downingtown East and West, and Bishop Shanahan. Bishop Shanahan is the only non-public school that competes in this athletic conference. Ron Reidinger is the athletic director. Bishop Shanahan offers a variety of different sports for students.

Feeder schools 
Bishop Shanahan enrolls fewer students compared to local public schools. To make up for this they register students from a broader geographic area. Bishop Shanahan High School is the only archdiocesan high school in Chester County, Pennsylvania. Chester County includes a broad spectrum of municipalities. These include but are not limited to: Downingtown, Coatesville, Avon Grove, Malvern, East Goshen, West Goshen, Oxford, Kennett Square, Phoenixville, Willistown, and Westtown. Some of Bishop Shanahan's main parochial feeder schools include: St. Agnes, Assumption B.V.M., St. Cornelius, St. Elizabeth, St. Joseph's, St. Maximillian Kolbe, St. Norbert, St. Patrick, SS. Peter and Paul, SS. Phillip and James, Sacred Heart, and SS. Simon and Jude. Within the entire Archdiocese of Philadelphia, there are roughly 44,900 parochial students. This includes students in grades Kindergarten through eighth grade.

Notes and references

External links
 

Catholic secondary schools in Pennsylvania
Roman Catholic Archdiocese of Philadelphia
Educational institutions established in 1957
Schools in Chester County, Pennsylvania
1957 establishments in Pennsylvania